Eutetrapha striolata is an extinct species of beetle in the family Cerambycidae, that existed during the Middle Miocene in what is now China. It was described by Zhang J. F. in 1989.

References

Saperdini
Beetles described in 1989